Klaus Borowski is a fictional crime investigator for the Kiel police in the ARD TV series Tatort. Borowski is portrayed by Axel Milberg.

Borowski is a lone wolf investigator who works for KK7 (Leib und Leben) in Kiel, having previously worked in Hanover but moved to Schleswig-Holstein after his wife left him. He drives an ageing VW Passat B2 wagon (registration plate KI-HL 189), but later changes to a red Volvo 760. His female sidekick was Dr. Frida Jung (Maren Eggert), until episode 761. From episode 777, he has a new female assistant, Sarah Brandt (Sibel Kekilli).

References

External links 

Fictional German police detectives
Fictional German people
Kiel
Male characters in television